Syfy was an Australian pay television channel dedicated to science fiction and fantasy television shows and movies. The channel was launched on 1 January 2014, replacing SF.

On 31 December 2019, it was replaced with Fox Sci-Fi.

History
In August 2013, it was announced that Foxtel had failed to complete negotiations with the TV1 General Entertainment Partnership (of which NBCUniversal was a part member) for a new carriage deal for their channel SF (an Australian science fiction channel), and would ultimately replace it with another science fiction dedicated channel once SF's carriage deal had expired. It was announced in September that Syfy, wholly owned by NBCUniversal, would replace SF in early 2014.

Syfy is part of the international brand Syfy Universal and is wholly owned and operated by Universal Networks International (a division of NBCUniversal). In contrast, SF was an Australian exclusive brand with only 33.33% owned by NBCUniversal (with the remaining shares equally being held by CBS Studios International and Sony Pictures Television).

On 15 April 2014, Syfy launched on Australian IPTV provider Fetch TV.

On 17 September 2017, the channel received a new logo alongside refreshed branding as part of an international overhaul of the brand by NBCUniversal.

On 7 November 2019, Foxtel announced that Syfy would be replaced by Fox Sci-Fi on 17 December 2019. Syfy finally closed down on Australian IPTV provider Fetch TV at midnight on 31 December 2019, after which the channel space created in 2006 by SF ceased to exist.

Programming 
Programming featured classic and new science fiction and fantasy television shows and movies.

First-Run Programming

Original Programming
Haunting: Australia

Acquired Programming
12 Monkeys (seasons 1–2)
Channel Zero
Continuum (seasons 3-4)
Dark Matter
Defiance (seasons 2-3)
Face Off
Geeks who Drink
Haven (seasons 4-5)
Killjoys
Misfits (season 5)
The Magicians
The Shannara Chronicles
Warehouse 13 (season 5)
Z Nation (seasons 1-2)

Second-Run Programming
Alphas
Angel
Battlestar Galactica
Battlestar Galactica (miniseries)
Buffy the Vampire Slayer
Charmed
Destination Truth
Doctor Who
Eureka
Fact or Faked: Paranormal Files
Ghost Hunters International
Grimm (season 1) 
Haven (seasons 1–3)
Hollywood Treasure
Knight Rider (2008 TV series)
Legend Quest
Misfits (seasons 1–4)
Orphan Black
Paranormal Witness
Primeval
Red Dwarf
Sanctuary
Stargate Atlantis
Stargate SG-1
Star Trek: The Next Generation
Star Trek: Voyager 
Torchwood
Warehouse 13 (seasons 1–4)

Movies
10.5
500 MPH Storm
American Warships
Arachnoquake
Battledogs
Bigfoot
CAT.8
Category 7: The End of the World
The 12 Disasters of Christmas
The Poseidon Adventure
Dawn of the Dead
Eve of Destruction
Exploding Sun
Ice Road Terror
Jabberwock
Metal Shifters
Miami Magma
Panic at Rock Island
Sharknado
Stonados
Tasmanian Devils

Criticism 
Syfy has come under criticism from Foxtel subscribers for a number of programming related issues, specifically regarding the high number of repeats and the low quality of the Syfy programming. Significantly, Syfy Australia did not hold the rights to any of the Star Trek franchise, while its predecessor did.
This has changed and Deep Space Nine, Enterprise, The Next Generation, The Original Series and Voyager has made their way onto the channel.

References

Syfy
Television channels and stations established in 2014
Television channels and stations disestablished in 2019
Television networks in Australia
English-language television stations in Australia
2014 establishments in Australia
2019 disestablishments in Australia
Science fiction television channels